Panagiotis Nikousios (1613 – 2 October 1673) was a Phanariote Greek physician and the first Christian Grand Dragoman (chief interpreter) of the Ottoman Porte, holding the office from  to his death in 1673. Nikousios was very well educated, having received instruction by the Jesuits in Chios, and gone on to attend the Patriarchal Academy in Constantinople and the University of Padua, where he studied medicine. On his return, he became personal physician to Köprülüzade Fazıl Ahmed Pasha, and when the latter became Grand Vizier in 1661, he appointed Nikousios as the first Grand Dragoman. He played an important role in the negotiations that ended the long Siege of Candia in 1669, and amassed a great library with many valuable manuscripts. His appointment as Grand Dragoman marks the start of the Phanariotes' rise to high political offices in the Ottoman government.

Sources
 

1613 births
1673 deaths
17th-century Greek people
Phanariotes
University of Padua alumni
Dragomans of the Porte
17th-century Greek physicians
Greek translators
17th-century physicians from the Ottoman Empire
People of the Ottoman–Venetian Wars
17th-century translators
17th-century Greek politicians
Diplomats from Istanbul
Physicians from Istanbul